Hans Andersen (27 May 1925 – 1 March 1999) was a Norwegian footballer who played as a striker for Lisleby, and the Norwegian national team.

References

1925 births
1999 deaths
Norwegian footballers
Norway international footballers
Lisleby FK players
Association football forwards